Bodies and Control and Money and Power is an EP by Priests released on Don Giovanni Records and Sister Polygon Records in 2014. The song "Doctor" was ranked 39th in Rolling Stone'''s list of the 50 best songs of 2014. The album was named the best album of 2014 by Impose Magazine''.

Track listing
 "Design Within Reach"
 "Doctor"
 "New"
 "Powertrip"
 "Modern Love/No Weapon"
 "Right Wing"
 "And Breeding"

References

Don Giovanni Records albums
Priests (band) albums
2014 albums